Polygala × dalmaisiana (P. fruticosa × P. myrtifolia), the sweet pea shrub, is an ornamental plant of genus Polygala in the family Polygalaceae. This plant is attractive to hummingbirds, and it is often propagated by cuttings.

As it does not tolerate temperatures below ,  
in temperate zones it must be grown under glass. However it may be placed outside in a sheltered spot during the summer months. It is a recipient of the Royal Horticultural Society's Award of Garden Merit.

References

 

dalmaisiana
Plant nothospecies